The European Short Course Championships 2005 were held in Trieste, Italy, from 8–11 December.

Medal table

Men's events

50 m freestyle

100 m freestyle

200 m freestyle

400 m freestyle

1500 m freestyle

50 m backstroke

100 m backstroke

200 m backstroke

50 m breaststroke

100 m breaststroke

200 m breaststroke

50 m butterfly

100 m butterfly

200 m butterfly

100 m individual medley

200 m individual medley

400 m individual medley

4×50 m freestyle relay

4×50 m medley relay

Women's events

50 m freestyle

100 m freestyle

200 m freestyle

400 m freestyle

800 m freestyle

50 m backstroke

100 m backstroke

200 m backstroke

50 m breaststroke

100 m breaststroke

200 m breaststroke

50 m butterfly

100 m butterfly

200 m butterfly

100 m individual medley

200 m individual medley

400 m individual medley

4×50 m freestyle relay

4×50 m medley relay

External links
Results book

European Short Course Swimming Championships
S
2005
International aquatics competitions hosted by Italy
Swimming competitions in Italy
European Short Course Swimming Championships
European Short Course Swimming Championships, 2005